Frank Hawley (19 July 1877 – 23 August 1913) was an English cricketer.  Hawley's batting style is unknown, though it is known he bowled fast-medium. It is not known with which arm he bowled.  He was born at New Radford, Nottinghamshire.

Hawley made a single first-class appearance for Nottinghamshire against Yorkshire at Trent Bridge in the 1897 County Championship.  He bowled 14 wicketless overs in Yorkshire's first-innings, while in Nottinghamshire's first-innings he was dismissed for a single run by Bobby Peel.  In Yorkshire's second-innings he took the wicket of George Hirst, finishing with figures of 1/31 from 10 overs.  The match ended in a draw.

He died at Sutton-in-Ashfield, Nottinghamshire on 23 August 1913.

References

External links
Frank Hawley at ESPNcricinfo
Frank Hawley at CricketArchive

1877 births
1913 deaths
Cricketers from Nottingham
English cricketers
Nottinghamshire cricketers